The Mineshaft Stakes is a Grade III American Thoroughbred horse race for four-year-olds and older run over a distance of  miles on the dirt in mid-February at the Fair Grounds Race Course in New Orleans, Louisiana. The event currently offers a purse of $250,000.

History

The event was inaugurated on 18 February 1973 as the Whirlaway Handicap, a handicap event for three-year-olds and older over a distance of one mile and forty years and was won by the five-year-old Guitar Player who was ridden by Leroy Moyers in a time of 1:41. The event was named in honor of Whirlaway, the fifth Triple Crown of Horse Racing winner in 1941. 

The event became a preparatory race for the Louisiana Handicap and New Orleans Handicap which were held later in the Fair Ground meeting.
The first four winners of the event went on and won the Louisiana Handicap. Most notable of these winners was the 1975 Preakness Stakes winner Master Derby who won the event as a short 2/5 odds-on favorite scoring by eight lengths. Master Derby went on to sweep the Louisiana Handicap and New Orleans Handicap.

The event was run in two divisions in 1975 and the winners were both trained and owned in part by Louie J. Roussel III.  In 1985 the distance of the event was increased to  miles. 

The event was not held between 1986 and 1991.

The event was upgraded to Grade III status in 2003.

In 2005 the event was renamed for Hall of Fame inductee Mineshaft, who finished second in the 2003 running to Balto Star. Although Mineshaft was defeated in this event his record of wins that year including the New Orleans Handicap earned him the title American Horse of the Year and U.S. Champion Older Male Horse. His son Nates Mineshaft won this event in 2012.

The event continues to be a major prep for the New Orleans Handicap. 

In 2020 the conditions of the event were changed from a handicap, to a stakes race with allowance weight conditions.

Records
Speed  record:
 miles:  1:42.01 –  Olympiad (2022) (New Track Record) 

Margins: 
8 lengths   –	Master Derby  (1976)

Most wins:
 2 - Silver Dust  (2019, 2020)

Most wins by a jockey:
 3 - Eddie Martin Jr. (1994, 1999, 2003)
 3 - Robby Albarado (2000, 2002, 2008)
 3 - Rosie Napravnik (2011, 2013, 2014)

Most wins by a trainer:
 3 - Louie J. Roussel III  (1975 - 2 divisions, 1994)

Most wins by an owner:
 2 - Louie J. Roussel III  (1975, 1994)
 2 - John A. Franks (1997, 1999)
 2 - Anstu Stables  (2003, 2015)
 2 - Tom R. Durant  (2019, 2020)

Whirlaway/Mineshaft – Louisiana Stakes double:
 Guitar Player (1973), Tom Tulle (1974), Hearts of Lettuce (1975), Master Derby (1976), Bucks Nephew (1996)

Whirlaway/Mineshaft – New Orleans Handicap double:
 Master Derby (1976), Precocity  (1999), Include (2001), Master Command (2007), Nates Mineshaft (2012), Honorable Duty (2017), Olympiad (2022)

Winners

Notes:

† The 1978 renewal of the Whirlaway Handicap was cancelled after several trainers removed their horses from the entry list and there were insufficient runners to hold the event.

† The 2006 renewal of the Mineshaft Handicap was not scheduled due to the shortened Fair Grounds meeting being transferred to Louisiana Downs with continuing after effects of Hurricane Katrina which damaged the racetrack.

See also
List of American and Canadian Graded races

References

Fair Grounds Race Course
Graded stakes races in the United States
Horse races in New Orleans
Horse racing
Grade 3 stakes races in the United States
Open mile category horse races
Recurring sporting events established in 1973
1973 establishments in Louisiana